Scotland Street Station was a railway station which stood in a cutting at the north end of Scotland Street, in Edinburgh, Scotland. First opened as Canonmills by the Edinburgh, Leith and Newhaven Railway, Scotland Street stood at the southern end of Scotland Street Tunnel that linked the city centre under the New Town to Canal Street. The trains that used the station were rope hauled by stationary steam engine.

The site of the station is now part of a public park.

References

External links

 Photos and details about the station

Disused railway stations in Edinburgh
Railway stations in Great Britain opened in 1842
Railway stations in Great Britain closed in 1868
Former North British Railway stations
1842 establishments in Scotland
1868 disestablishments in Scotland